The following lists events that happened during 1805 in Australia.

Incumbents
Monarch - George III

Governors
Governors of the Australian colonies:
Governor of New South Wales – Captain Philip King
Lieutenant-Governor of Southern Van Diemen's Land – David Collins
Lieutenant-Governor of Northern Van Diemen's Land – William Paterson

Events
 24 May – William Bligh is appointed the fourth Governor of New South Wales; he arrives at Port Jackson to replace King on 6 August 1806.
 8 June – John Macarthur returned to New South Wales as a civilian settler; the British Government accepted his resignation from the New South Wales Corps and approved his return.

Exploration and settlement
15 February – Governor King instructed (apparently reluctantly) a surveyor to measure 5,000 acres (20 km2) for John Macarthur at Cowpastures, where Macarthur had been promised land by the Secretary of State for War and the Colonies, Lord Camden.  Macarthur named his property Camden Park in honour of his sponsor.

References 

 
Australia
Years of the 19th century in Australia